Pradeep Pandey (born 19 April 1953) is an Indian former cricketer. He played ten first-class matches for Bengal between 1972 and 1984.

See also
 List of Bengal cricketers

References

External links
 

1953 births
Living people
Indian cricketers
Bengal cricketers
Cricketers from Kolkata